Clan MacNeil, also known in Scotland as Clan Niall, is a highland Scottish clan of Irish origin. According to their early genealogies and some sources they're descended from Eógan mac Néill and Niall of the Nine Hostages. The clan is particularly associated with the Outer Hebridean island of Barra. The early history of Clan MacNeil is obscure, however despite this the clan claims to descend from the legendary Irish King Niall of the Nine Hostages, who is counted as the 1st Clan Chief, the current Clan Chief being the 47th. The clan itself takes its name from a Niall who lived in the 13th or early 14th century, and who belonged to the same dynastic family of Cowal and Knapdale as the ancestors of the Lamonts, MacEwens of Otter, Maclachlans, and the MacSweens. While the clan is centred in Barra in the Outer Hebrides, there is a branch of the clan in Argyll (McNeill/MacNeill) that some historians have speculated was more senior in line, or possibly even unrelated. However, according to Scots law the current chief of Clan MacNeil is the chief of all MacNeil(l)s.

History

Origins

MacNeils of Barra

Traditional origin
The MacNeils of Barra claim descent from a prince of the Uí Néill dynasty, Ánrothán Ua Néill, son of Áed, son of Flaithbertach Ua Néill, King of Ailech and Cenél nEógain, who died in 1036. Anrothan emigrated to Scotland in the 11th century. Through him the MacNeils of Barra also naturally claim descent from the legendary Niall of the Nine Hostages. Anrothan is claimed as ancestor of several clans in the Argyll vicinity: Clan Lamont, Clan Maclachlan, Clan MacEwen of Otter, and also the Irish Sweeneys (MacSween). If the MacNeils are indeed connected to Anrothan, then they appear to have been a junior branch of the family and were certainly overshadowed in the 13th century by the MacSweens, Lamonts and descendants of Gilchrist.

An opposing theory, proposed by Nicholas Maclean Bristol, is that there is reason to believe that they descend from Neill Maclean who appears on Exchequer Rolls at a time when Tarbert Castle was being rebuilt by Robert the Bruce. In 1252 Neil Macneil, fifth of Barra was described as a prince at a Council of the Lord of the Isles. His son was Neil Og Macneil who is believed to have fought for Robert the Bruce at the Battle of Bannockburn in 1314. An alternate hypothesis is a descent from a Bute family in service to the Clan MacRuari and granted Barra by them after the conquest of Bute by Scotland.

History

The earliest contemporary record of the Macneils of Barra is only in 1427, when Giolla Adhamhnáin Mac Néill (typically anglicised as Gilleonan Macneil) received a charter of Barra and Boisdale, from the Lord of the Isles, following the forfeiture of the previous Lordships of Uist and Garmoran, earlier that year.

Gilleonan's namesake, reckoned the twelfth chief, was one of the island lords who were tricked into meeting James V of Scotland at Portree, where they were promised safe conduct but instead were arrested and imprisoned. The MacNeil chief of Barra was not released until the king's death in 1542, when the Regent Moray wanted to use the island chiefs to counterbalance the growing power of the Clan Campbell. His son was amongst the chiefs who supported the last Lord of the Isles in his alliance with Henry VIII of England in 1545. The treaty they signed with the English as overlords proclaimed the ancient enmity between the chiefs of the isles and the kingdom of Scotland.

In 1579 the Bishop of the Isles made a complaint of molestation against the MacNeil chief of Barra. His son, the next chief, was denounced as a rebel by the Privy Council so many times that he was described as a "hereditary outlaw" and was known as the Turbulent or Ruari the Tatar. He has also been described as the last of the Viking raiders as he often raided from his Kisimul Castle. The king eventually arranged for his loyal vassals to extirpate and root out the chief of Clan MacNeil, whose own nephews captured him and placed him in chains.

During the Scottish Civil War of the 17th century the chief of Clan MacNeil, Neil Og, was appointed as Colonel of the Horse by Charles II of England and fought at the Battle of Worcester in 1651. His grandson was Roderick Dhu the Black who received a Crown charter for all of the lands of Barra to be erected into a free barony. Roderick also led his clan at the Battle of Killiecrankie in 1689. He also supported the Jacobite rising of 1715 and as a result his two sons, Roderick and James, went into exile in France. Upon their father's death they returned but for his Jacobite sympathies, Roderick was consigned to a prison ship, the Royal Sovereign. He was then taken to London and not released until July 1747.

The clan prospered until the twenty-first chief, General Roderick Macneil, was forced to sell Barra in 1838.

McNeills of Argyll (in Taynish, Gigha and Colonsay)

The origins of the Argyll MacNeills is also obscure. In the late 15th century, one MacNeill is recorded as the keeper of Castle Sween. In the mid 16th century, a certain Torquil MacNeill was known as the "chief and principal of the clan and surname of Maknelis". The 19th century scholar W.F. Skene considered Torquil to be the last of the hereditary MacNeill keepers of the castle. Skene believed that after Torquil's demise, the hereditary office passed to the MacMillans. During the time of Torquil, there are records of separate clans on Barra and Gigha. Skene did not consider Torquil to be a member of either of these clans, since both clans had chiefs of their own. A recent hypothesis make Torquil, son of Niall, living in 1440, the eponym of the clan, thus totally unrelated to the Barra MacNeils. His Norse name suggests his kindred were remnants of the lordship of Somerled, along with the Clan McCorquodale and Clan MacIver.

The chief of the Gigha MacNeills at this time was Neill MacNeill, who was killed in about 1530. His only daughter inherited his lands and handed them over to her illegitimate brother, Neill. According to historian John Bannerman, while the lands of the chief passed to his daughter, the chiefship passed over to Torquil who was her second cousin. Bannerman considered it likely that when Torquil died, the chiefship passed to the illegitimate Neill.

In 1553, this Neill sold the island to James MacDonald of Islay. Neill died without issue, and the next in line to the chiefship was another Neil, who obtained the lands of Taynish. His descendant Hector MacNeill of Taynish purchased Gigha in 1590. With the power of the Campbells growing and spreading out into the Inner Hebrides, the influence of the McNeills of Gigha decreased. At about this time the MacNeils on more remote island of Barra, far removed of Campbell power, began to grow in prominence and for a long time since have been regarded as Chief of the Clan and Name. Descending from this branch were the MacNeils of Colonsay who obtained Colonsay in 1700 and owned it until 1904 when it was sold by the heirs of Major General Sir John Carstairs McNeill. According to Moncreiffe, there is reason to believe that historically this branch was superior to the current chiefs of the Clan MacNeil. There is even a school of thought that there is no relation at all between this branch of McNeills to that of Barra. However, according to a 1962 decree by the Lord Lyon, the chiefs of MacNeil of Barra are chiefs of the whole name of MacNeil by Scots law until such time as the MacNeils of Colonsay acquire a Chief of their own. The last Clan Chief of the Clan McNeill of Colonsay was Alexander Malcolm McNeill who was born in New Zealand in 1899 and Matriculated his Arms in 1972. He held the title until his death in 1988. His son John Duncan McNeill became Head of the Clan on his father's death but did not apply to matriculate his own Arms. Duncan's eldest daughter, Deborah Jane McNeill, has petitioned the Lord Lyon to become the next Clan Chief of the Clan McNeill of Colonsay.

Modern Clan Macneil

The 18th and 19th centuries saw severe hardship to Clan MacNeil clansfolk. During this era there was mass clearance from Barra to Canada, Australia, New Zealand, and the United States. During the chiefship of Colonel Roderick (c.1755–1822) Barra suffered its first mass clearances. Ironically the chief described himself as a melieuratier (an "improver"). One mass exodus of Barra folk was led by Gilleonan, elder son of the chief. This consisted of 370 Catholic Barra folk (about 75 families in total) who emigrated in August to Pictou, Nova Scotia. In 1838, after going broke, Colonel Roderick's son and heir, Lieutenant General Roderick MacNeil of Barra, sold Barra to Colonel Gordon of Cluny. When Roderick died in 1863 the chiefship passed to a cousin (descendant of Gilleonan) who had emigrated during the mass emigrations to Canada in 1802.

Robert Lister MacNeil was born in 1889. An American citizen and a trained architect, he succeeded the chiefship of Clan MacNeil in 1915. In 1937 he was able to purchase Barra and the ruinous Kisimul Castle largely using the money from his second wife. Immediately he began work restoring the castle, aided in part by funds from a British Government grant. By his death in 1970 he had completed the restoration of the castle, ancient seat of the chiefs of the clan. In 2001 the castle was leased to Historic Scotland for one thousand years at the rent of £1 per year and a bottle of Talisker whisky. In October 2004 the chief handed over 3,600 hectares, comprising almost all of his estate on Barra to Scottish Ministers. The current chief of Clan MacNeil is Roderick Wilson MacNeil of Barra, The MacNeil of Barra, Chief of Clan Niall and 26th of Barra, also Baron of Barra. The chief is a member of the Standing Council of Scottish Chiefs. The current chief, while a United States citizen, lives in Edinburgh, Scotland.

Regarding the ascent of the 45th chief (Robert Lister Macneil), The Arms of the Scottish Bishoprics (1917) states:
"In 1914 Roderick Ambrose MacNeil, Chief of the MacNeils of Barra, died in the United States of America, being still a British citizen, leaving two sons. Paul Humphrey MacNeil, the elder son, in his father's lifetime renounced his allegiance to the British Crown and became an American citizen; in consequence of this his father in 1913 nominated his second son, Robert Lister MacNeil, the petitioner, to succeed him as Chief of the Clan, and assigned to him the arms pertaining to the Chief. Robert Lister MacNeil therefore petitioned the Lyon King to grant him the arms recorded by General Roderick MacNeil in 1824, which were borne by his (the petitioner's father), Roderick Ambrose MacNeil."

Clan Symbols

Crest Badges

Clan members who wish to show their allegiance to a particular clan and chief can wear a crest badge.  Scottish crest badges usually contain the heraldic crest and heraldic motto of the chief of the clan. While clan members may wear the badge, the crest and motto within it are the heraldic property of the chief alone. A crest badge suitable for a clan member of Clan MacNeil contains the crest: on a chapeau gules furred ermine, a rock proper. The motto upon the badge is: buaidh no bas, which translates from Scottish Gaelic as "to conquer or die", or "victory or death").

Though not a clan in its own right, MacNeil(l)s who consider themselves of the Colonsay "branch" have used the following crest badge to distinguish themselves from the Barra "branch". This crest badge contains the crest: an armoured dexter arm with dagger; and the motto: vincere aut mori (also written as vincere vel mori), which translates from Latin as "conquer or die".

Clan Badge

Another symbol used by clan members is a clan badge, or sometimes called a plant badge. The original clan badges were merely plants worn in bonnets or hung from a pole or spear. Today, the clan badge attributed to Clan MacNeil is dryas. Trefoil has also been attributed to the clan, however this clan badge may actually be attributed to the McNeills of Gigha, a branch of Clan MacNeil. Trefoil has also been attributed to the Lamonts, another clan in Argyl. The Lamonts and MacNeils/McNeills both claim descent from the same O'Neill who settled in Scotland in the Middle Ages.

Tartan

There have been several tartans associated with the name MacNeil / MacNeill. However, in 1997 the chief of Clan MacNeil directed members of the clan that there were only two tartans that he recognised as "clan tartans". These were: MacNeil of Barra and MacNeil of Colonsay. The MacNeil of Barra tartan has been the standard MacNeil of Barra tartan for over a century.

Coat of arms

In Scotland, all coats of arms belong to a single person. The coat of arms typically attributed to Clan MacNeil belongs solely to the current chief of the clan. A depiction of the coat of arms is painted in the Great Hall of Kisimul Castle in Castlebay, Barra, Scotland.

This coat of arms is divided into quarters:
 Upper Left: Lion Rampant (mimicking the Royal Standard of the King of Scotland)
 Upper Right: Castle in the water (symbolizing Kisimul Castle in Castlebay)
 Lower Left: 3-masted ship (Representing either the seafaring nature of the clan or the migration of the clan from the Ulster, Ireland to Barra, Scotland
 Lower Right: Red Hand of Ulster surrounded by nine shackles representing Niall of the Nine Hostages

Surrounding the Coat of Arms :
 Crest: a Rock (same as on the clan badge)
 Chapeau: Red velvet cap lined with ermine, symbolic of a Baron
 Helm: Height of the Helmet is determined by rank
 Mantle: Fabric surrounding the Arms
 Supporters: Two lions rampant
 Compartment: The base of the Arms, made of Dryas flowers (the clan badge)

Distribution

The topic of who is a MacNeil can be a complicated one. By convention, anyone descended from a member of Clan MacNeil can claim membership. Because of the history of slavery in the United States and the Caribbean, however, many African-Americans may bear a MacNeil surname. Because it was not uncommon for a female slave to bear her slave-master's child, several African-American MacNeils may have legitimate descent from a MacNeil, however such descent can rarely be proven, and most African-American MacNeils remain uninvolved with clan activities and do not claim descent from the clan. Generally speaking, Caucasians with MacNeil surnames number between 40,000 and 80,000 worldwide.

In England, Wales, and the Isle of Man
source: UK National Statistics Database 2002
McNeil: 3,522 (rank:2262)
McNeill: 4,212 (rank:1909)
MacNeil: 314 (rank:15845)
MacNeill: 286 (rank:16904)
Sizable populations also exist in Scotland, Ireland, Canada, France, Australia, and New Zealand

In the United States
McNeil: 33,239 (rank:961) (source: 2000 US Census)
McNeill: 22,383 (rank:1387) (source: 1990 US Census)
McNeal: 8,928 (rank:1723) (source: 2010 US Census)
MacNeil: 2,487 (rank:8716) (source: 1990 US Census)
McNiel: (rank:14781) (source: 2010 US Census
McNeilly: (rank:16430) (source: 1990 US Census)
MacNeill: (rank:28690) (source: 1990 US Census)
MacNeal: 540 (rank:36525) (source: 2010 US Census)

Chiefs of Clan MacNeil

Current chief: Roderick "Rory" Wilson MacNeil of Barra, The MacNeil of Barra, Chief of Clan Niall and 27th of Barra, Baron of Barra.

The chiefs of Clan MacNeil, are reckoned from Niall Noigíallach (Niall of the Nine Hostages), from whom all the MacNeil chiefs claim descent. The clan claims Niall Noigíallach as its first chief, while the current chief, Rory MacNeil, is reckoned as the 47th chief.

See also
McNeil
McNeill
MacNeil
MacNeill
McNeal
MacNeal
MacNeille
Victory or Death
McNeil (surname)
The Barra MacNeils

Footnotes

References

Gibson, John G. Old and New World Highland Bagpiping. MacGill-Queen's University Press, 2002. .

Moncreiffe of that Ilk, Iain. The Highland Clans. London: Barrie & Rockliff, 1967.

External links

Clan MacNeil Association of America
Clan MacNeil in Canada
Clan MacNeil Net
 Iain MacNeil – Daily Telegraph obituary

 
MacNeil
Gaelic families of Norse descent